I Am with You may refer to:
 I Am with You (1943 film), a French musical comedy film
 I Am with You (1948 film), a Swedish drama film

See also
 I'm with You (disambiguation)